Gerhard Kleinmagd (7 November 1937; Hamburg – 17 November 2010) is a German politician, former member of the Christian Democratic Union, then member of the Social Democratic Party of Germany. Kleinmagd was member of the Hamburg Parliament for the CDU between 1982 and 1993, and for the borough parliament of Eimsbüttel for the SPD until 2008.

References

External links 
Kleinmagd on abgeordnetenwatch.de, retrieved on 2009-07-26, 

1937 births
2010 deaths
Social Democratic Party of Germany politicians
Christian Democratic Union of Germany politicians
Members of the Hamburg Parliament
People from Eimsbüttel